Francesca Refsum Jensenius is a Norwegian political scientist, currently teaching at the University of Oslo and working at the Norwegian Institute of International Affairs. Her work relates to comparative politics, and has specifically focused on the Indian political economy. She is a recipient of the Nils Klim Prize in 2018 for her contributions to scholarship.

Career 
Jensenius completed her undergraduate degree from the University of Oslo in 2005, studying for a bachelors in arts and the Hindi language. She earned an M.A. in political science from Duke University. Her doctoral work was completed at the University of California, Berkeley, and studied electoral quotas for scheduled castes in India. She is currently a professor at the University of Oslo, in the department of political science.

In 2017, Jensenius published Social Justice through Inclusion: The Consequences of Electoral Quotas in India (Oxford University Press) for which she won the Nils Klim Prize in 2018. Her research work has since examined the economic agency of women, political representation, and legal regimes in comparative context. She has been published in Comparative Political Studies, the American Journal of Political Science, Journal of Politics, and Studies in Indian Politics.

References 

Norwegian political scientists
Norwegian women academics
Norwegian women scientists
Year of birth missing (living people)
Living people